Constance may refer to:

Places
Konstanz, Germany, sometimes written as Constance in English
Constance Bay, Ottawa, Canada
Constance, Kentucky
Constance, Minnesota
Constance (Portugal)
Mount Constance, Washington State

People
Constance (given name), female given name, also includes list of people with the name
Andrew Constance (born 1973), Australian politician
Angela Constance (born 1970), Scottish politician
Ansley Constance (born 1966), Seychelles politician
Lincoln Constance (1909–2001), American botanist
Nathan Constance (born 1979), English actor

Other
Constance (album), a 2000 album by Southpacific
Constance (film), a 1998 erotic film directed by Knud Vesterskov
Constance (magazine), arts and literature magazine based in New Orleans
Constance (novel), 1982 novel by Lawrence Durrell
Constance Billard School for Girls, a fictional private school in Gossip Girl
HMS Constance, six ships of the British Royal Navy
, later USS YP-633, a United States Navy patrol boat in commission from 1917 to 1922
Constance railway station, a former loco depot and stop on the Wolgan Valley Railway
Constance Lake First Nation in Canada

See also

Constanța, a city in Romania, by the Black Sea
NMS Constanța, a cruiser-sized submarine tender and the largest purpose-built warship of the World War II Romanian Navy
Constanza (disambiguation), the word Constance in Italian and Spanish
Lake Constance (disambiguation)